Imdad Ali Pitafi is a Pakistani politician who had been a Member of the Provincial Assembly of Sindh, from May 2013 to May 2018.

Early life and education
He was born on 1 January 1974 in Tando Allahyar.

He has a degree of Bachelors of Arts from Sindh University.

Political career
He ran for the seat of the Provincial Assembly of Sindh as a candidate of Pakistan Peoples Party (PPP) from Constituency PS-52 (Hyderabad-X) in 2002 Pakistani general election but was unsuccessful.
 
He was elected to the Provincial Assembly of Sindh as a candidate of PPP from Constituency PS-52 (TANDO ALLAYAR-II) in 2013 Pakistani general election. In August 2016, he was into Sindh's provincial cabinet of Chief Minister Syed Murad Ali Shah and was made Provincial Minister of Sindh for Works and Services.

He was re-elected to Provincial Assembly of Sindh as a candidate of PPP from Constituency PS-61 (Tando Allahyar-II) in 2018 Pakistani general election.

References

Living people
Sindh MPAs 2013–2018
1974 births
Pakistan People's Party MPAs (Sindh)
Sindh MPAs 2018–2023